Dag-Eilev Akerhaugen Fagermo (born 28 January 1967) is a Norwegian football coach. He is head coach of the Norwegian Eliteserien club Vålerenga.

Coaching career

Early career
Fagermo was born in Bærum, and grew up in 
Raufoss, Norway.He started his coaching career in lower leagues with his first job as head coach being at Skarphedin in 1995. He took over Pors Grenland in 2002 and moved on to Notodden in 2004. Fagermo became head coach of second tier club Strømsgodset ahead of the 2006 season. Strømsgodset promoted to the top flight in Fagermo's first season in charge and finished in eleventh position in their first season back in the top flight in 2007.

Odd
Ahead of the 2008 season, he became head coach at Odd Grenland. Under Fagermo's management, Odd finished in third position in the 2014 Tippeligaen. This was Odd's first top flight medal since the 1956–57 season. Odd also finished in bronze medal position in 2016. In 2019, his last season at the club, Odd finished in fourth position dropping from third place in the final round of the season. Since Fagermo's appointment as head coach of Odd on 17 December 2007, he coached the team in twelve consecutive seasons.

Vålerenga
On 31 January 2020, Fagermo was announced as head coach of Vålerenga, replacing Ronny Deila.

Managerial statistics

Honours
Strømsgodset
1. divisjon: 2006

References

1967 births
Living people
Sportspeople from Bærum
Norwegian footballers
Raufoss IL players
Norwegian football managers
Eliteserien managers
Notodden FK managers
Strømsgodset Toppfotball managers
Odds BK managers
Vålerenga Fotball managers
Association footballers not categorized by position